Willem van der Kaay (originally van der Kaaij) (5 May 1831 – 29 July 1918) was a Dutch judge and liberal politician. He was a member of the House of Representatives for Alkmaar from 1875 to 1894, and served as Minister of Justice in Joan Röell's cabinet from 1874 to 1879.

References
KAAIJ, Willem van der (1831-1918), biography at the Institute for Netherlands History (in Dutch).

1831 births
1918 deaths
19th-century Dutch judges
Leiden University alumni
Members of the House of Representatives (Netherlands)
Ministers of Justice of the Netherlands
People from Alkmaar